Naima El-Rhouati (born 19 July 1976) is a Moroccan gymnast. She competed in five events at the 1996 Summer Olympics.

References

1976 births
Living people
Moroccan female artistic gymnasts
Olympic gymnasts of Morocco
Gymnasts at the 1996 Summer Olympics
Place of birth missing (living people)